Volovec may refer to:

 Volovec (Tatra), a peak (2.063 m) in the Western Tatras, at the border of Slovakia and Poland
 Volovec (Volovec), a peak (1.284 m) in the Volovec Mountains, eastern Slovakia
 Volovec Mountains, a mountain range in eastern Slovakia
 Volovec (stream), a mountain stream in Low Tatras
 Volovec, a village in western Ukraine